Justice Tillinghast may refer to:

Pardon E. Tillinghast, chief justice of the Rhode Island Supreme Court
Thomas Tillinghast, associate justice of the Rhode Island Supreme Court